Shafik Kuchi Kagimu (born 28 November 1998) is a Ugandan international footballer who plays for Uganda Revenue Authority, as a midfielder.

Club career
Born in Nsambya, he played youth football for Zebra FC, Kampala Junior Team and Water FC. He began his senior career with Uganda Revenue Authority in 2015. At the end of the 2016–17 season he was nominated for the 'Best Midfielder' award at the UPL Awards. In April 2019 he said that he was being played in more attacking roles, resulting in better form and more goals.

2018–19 season
He scored seven league goals in 28 matches and one in the Uganda Cup where URA FC  bowed out at the round of 16 to Bright Stars FC.
Kagimu recorded six assists in a busy season where the tax collectors finished third on the 16 team log.

International career
He made his international debut for Uganda in 2017.

Personal life
He studied for a degree in Procurement and Logistics management at Kampala University.

References

1998 births
Living people
Ugandan footballers
Uganda international footballers
Uganda Revenue Authority SC players
Uganda Premier League players
Association football midfielders